The women's 63 kg competition in at the 2021 African Judo Championships was held on 21 May at the Dakar Arena in Dakar, Senegal.

Results

Main Round

Repechage

References

External links
 

W63
Africa
African W63